The A99 road is entirely within the former county of Caithness in the Highland of Scotland. It runs generally north/northeast from the A9 at Latheron to Wick and to the A836 at John o' Groats. It was part of the A9 until the A9 classification was transferred to what had been the A895-A882 link between Latheron and Thurso. Between Latheron and Wick it follows, mostly, the route of one of Telford's roads.

Towns, villages and junctions

The A99 runs through or near towns and villages listed below. Junctions listed are with other classified roads.

Road safety
In June 2008, the Road Safety Foundation announced that the most dangerous road in Scotland was the 27 km stretch of the A99 between the A9 at Latheron and Wick. With twelve fatal and serious casualty accidents in three years between 2004 and 2006, the road was one of only four roads in Great Britain rated as Black—the highest risk band—in the EuroRAP report.

References

External links

EuroRAP GB Tracking Survey Results 2008
Road Safety Foundation

Roads in Scotland
Transport in Highland (council area)